Caliroa quercuscoccineae, the scarlet oak sawfly or slug oak sawfly, is a species of sawfly in the family Tenthredinidae.

Ecology
Larvae feed on a wide range of oaks including pin, black, red, and white oaks as well as its namesake scarlet oak.

Range
This sawfly is a pest of oaks, and has been reported from Massachusetts through North Carolina, Kentucky, Tennessee, and Georgia.

References

External links

Tenthredinidae